Stora Mossen metro station is a station on the Green line of the Stockholm metro. The station is on an embankment and has a single island platform, with access from a pedestrian subway under the line linking Drottningholmsvägen and Stora Mossens Backe.

The station lies on the route of a line known as the  that formerly linked Alvik and Islandstorget. The Ängbybanan was designed and built for use by the future metro, but was operated from 1944 as part of line 11 of the Stockholm tramway. Stora mossen station was inaugurated as part of the metro on 26 October 1952 with the conversion of the Ängbybanan and its extension to form the metro line between Hötorget and Vällingby.

Gallery

References

Green line (Stockholm metro) stations
Railway stations opened in 1952